Max Weber (May 31, 1836 – August 10, 1897) was a German lawyer, municipal official and National Liberal politician. He was the father of the social scientists, Max and Alfred Weber.

Biography
Max Weber was born in Bielefeld, on May 31, 1836. He came from a family of Westphalian origin, with a background as merchants and industrialists in the textile business. He was a brother of the entrepreneur Carl David Weber. He studied at Göttingen, where he became member of Burschenschaft Hannovera (fraternity), and Berlin and received a doctorate, becoming a doctor of law. Between 1862 and 1869, he worked for the municipal council in Erfurt as a magistrate, having previously held this position in Berlin. He began working in Berlin in 1893 and finally, in Charlottenburg.

He was a leading member of the National Liberal Party and was a member of the central executive committee. He was a member of the Berlin City Council. Between 1872 and 1877 and again from 1879 to 1884, Weber was a member of the German Empire Reichstag. He was also a member of the Prussian House of Representatives from 1868 to 1882 and from 1884 to 1897, the Reich Debt Commission, and the Prussian Debt Commission. Politically, he was a "constitutionalist" (a supporter of the monarchy and the constitution) and a follower of Rudolf von Bennigsen.

He wrote several journal articles on politics and statistics. Throughout his life, he avoided acting in a way that would make him seem radical, or not part of the establishment.

He died on August 10, 1897 in Riga while traveling with his friend. The cause of his death has been uncertain, possibly a bleeding ulcer. He was buried in Berlin (Kirchhof Jerusalem und Neue Kirche IV cemetery).

Personal life
In 1863, he married Helene Weber, née Fallenstein (1844–1919), daughter of poet George Friedrich Fallenstein (1790–1853). They had eight children, six of whom reached adulthood, including the sociologist Max (Jr.) and the economist Alfred Weber. His daughter, Clara (1875–1953), married one of Theodor Mommsen's sons.

His house was often visited by prominent politicians, such as Rudolf von Bennigsen and immediate subordinates of Otto von Bismarck. He was also visited by intellectuals, like professors Heinrich von Treitschke, Heinrich von Sybel, and Theodor Mommsen. His wife was an intellectual herself and an active participant in the discussions.

Unlike his ascetic wife, Weber "enjoyed earthly pleasures". This created marital tension in the family and was one of the reasons he grew estranged from his son, Max Weber, Jr. The conflicting influences of his parents were often cited as important influences on the younger Max. Two months before his death, he had a serious quarrel with his son, Max, regarding his treatment of his wife, a quarrel that was never resolved and shortly afterward, following his funeral, young Max suffered a severe and long depression, events that are all seen as related to one another. The event was such an influence on the young Weber that it resulted in several articles.

Notes
 a  Numerous sources refer to Max Weber as Max Weber, Sr. or senior. This likely serves to differentiate between the more famous young Max Weber and his father. In those contexts, the younger Max is sometimes referred to as Max Weber, Jr.

References

External links
 

1836 births
1897 deaths
Politicians from Bielefeld
People from the Province of Westphalia
German Protestants
National Liberal Party (Germany) politicians
Members of the 2nd Reichstag of the German Empire
Max Weber
Members of the Prussian House of Representatives
University of Göttingen alumni
Humboldt University of Berlin alumni